Ivan Usenko (born February 12, 1983) is a Belarusian ice hockey defenceman. He is currently playing with the Lokomotiv Orsha of the Belarusian Extraleague B.

International
Usenko was named to the Belarus men's national ice hockey team for competition at the 2014 IIHF World Championship.

References

External links

1983 births
Living people
Belarusian ice hockey defencemen
HC Dinamo Minsk players
HK Gomel players
HK Neman Grodno players
HC Sarov players
HC Shakhtyor Soligorsk players
Sportspeople from Nizhny Novgorod
Swift Current Broncos players
Torpedo Nizhny Novgorod players
HK Vitebsk players
Yunost Minsk players